Ryan Farish is an American artist, composer, songwriter, producer, and multi-instrumentist. Hailing from Norfolk, Virginia, and based in Los Angeles, California, Ryan is known for his downtempo electronica, chillout, and uplifting dance music. His sound is a combination of anthemic melodies layered with organic downtempo grooves along with a collection of releases that infuse dance rhythms with uplifting themes. Ryan established his self-owned record label in 2008, RYTONE Entertainment, as a home to his own releases as well as those of other collaborative artists.

Farish's achievements include seven albums on Billboard Charts, 70 million views from fan created videos on YouTube, 333 million plays on Pandora Radio, Amazon Cloud, Apple Music, and Spotify, performance at Neon Carnival at Coachella sponsored by Google Play, T-Mobile, and Armani Exchange, music licenses to corporations such as: Audi, Chevrolet, MTV, VH1, Sony, Google,  T-Mobile, and the 2013 film Despicable Me 2, as well as a series of feature videos that Farish makes a personal appearance in, with Audi North America and Bang & Olufsen.

As a producer, Farish has been awarded a GMA Dove Award and co-writer/co-publisher for a Grammy Award-nominated recording. He has also produced his globally syndicated lifestyle brand and radio show and podcast, "Chasing the Sun" and "Positive Chillout".

Farish launched his music career on the first generation MP3.com. It was at this site where he received 1.8 million downloads of his trademark, electronic/world music. As a result of this momentum, Farish has been noted as a "Download King" by L.A.'s Music Connection Industry Magazine.

In 2006, Ryan Farish gained attention on YouTube when his song, "Pacific Wind", was featured in a popular video, entitled "Remember Me", created by a 15-year-old high school student named Lizzie Palmer. The video, a sentimental montage of soldiers in the Iraq War, was ranked as the 48th most-watched YouTube video of all time as of April 26, 2008. To date, this video has received 32 million views. Palmer and Farish gained renown from the prominence of the video; the former was interviewed on news networks, including CNN.

Farish's music is featured across YouTube from fan-created videos that have reached beyond 70 million views.

Media
In 2019, Ryan's music is part of Apple's iOS 13 in over a billion devices. With iOS 13, Memories in the Photos App can be created with Ryan's songs "Child" and "Letter from Home" in the 'Electronic' Genre.

In 2015, Farish's 11th studio release, Spectrum (RYTONE/2015), debuted on Pandora Premieres and was awarded the "Hot Shot Debut" by Billboard Magazine, coming in at chart position #5 for Best Selling New Age Albums in the first week of sales.

In November 2014, Farish launched his "Positive Chillout" station on AccuRadio.

From November 26 to December 2, 2013, Farish's album Destiny debuted on Pandora Premieres.

In the summer of 2013, Ryan Farish's song "Be Near" from his album Wonderfall (2008) was licensed by NBCUniversal/Universal Studios to be used in radio promotional for the major motion picture Despicable Me 2.

In January 2011, Farish debuted his progressive trance radio show Elevation on Hot 100.5 on WVHT of Max Media. Elevation is a two-hour exclusive DJ mix set produced and hosted by Ryan Farish.

In 2004, after many requests as to what genre Ryan Farish considered his music to be, Farish coined the name "Positive Chillout" to be a reference to his unique brand of uplifting, chillout electronic music. In November 2006, Farish published this title, on his owned/operated Live365 internet radio station, "Positive Chillout", as well as RyanFarish.com and PositiveChillout.com. The Live365 radio station was first created in November 2006 as "Positive Chillout". In 2010, Ryan re-launched the show on DI.FM's (Digitally Imported) "Chillout Dreams" channel as "Positive Chillout with Ryan Farish". The new show brought an emphasis on Electronic Chillout Music, which is considered positive and uplifting.

Throughout the 2000s and early 2010s, much of Farish's works were featured on The Weather Channel's Local on the 8s segments and theme track to "Storm Stories".

Endorsements
In December 2012, displaying his album Life in Stereo, Google Play selected Ryan Farish as one of the Best Unsigned Artists of 2012.

In November 2012, Ryan's pursuit for excellence in sound was highlighted in a video entitled "Bang & Olufsen Advanced Sound System for Audi", featuring Bang & Olufsen's commitment to superior quality and design with Audi.

In 2011, Ryan Farish was featured by Audi USA in a series called "Remarkable Audi". In this short film, which also features Ryan's music, Ryan discusses the qualities of Audi's audio engineering and how he uses the advanced sound of his Audi as part of his creative process.

In late 2009, Ryan Farish signed an exclusive endorsement deal with Yamaha Corporation of America.

Collaborations
Ryan Farish created custom presets to Plugin Alliance's virtual synth Oberhausen released in April 2019.

On November 3, 2017, Farish and BBMak singer Christian Burns collaborated on two songs for his album Primary Colors, "Find You" and "Safe in This Place".

On October 11, 2011, Ryan Farish and Paul Hardcastle announced Transcontinental, a collection of new music featuring the vocals of Paul's daughter Maxine Hardcastle and son Paul Hardcastle Jr.  Transcontinental followed the heels of "Sunset Sky" which Farish digitally released with Paul's son on RYTONE Entertainment featuring Paul Hardcastle Jr. on the saxophone mixed with a twist on Ryan's signature melodies.  This initial journey between Ryan Farish and Paul Hardcastle began with the single release on June 22, 2010, titled "Reflections".

On August 16, 2011, Ryan's album Upon a Dream was released. It includes collaborations with Tiff Lacey, Aprille Goodman, Madelin Zero, and Dave Moisan.

Farish also co-wrote and co-published "Listen" for Trin-i-tee 5:7's album T57, which was awarded a GMA Dove Award and Grammy Award-nominated recording.

Ryan has collaborated with a variety of artists. In 2008, Ryan worked with multi-platinum recording artist Donna Lewis to release their first collaborative single, "Dancing Angel". Lewis is widely known for her No. 1 hit "I Love You Always Forever" (Now in a Minute/Atlantic Records).

Awards
 2011 – Producer Ryan Farish was named as an elected Governor by The Recording Academy Washington, D.C. Chapter Board
 2010 – Producer Ryan Farish was named by The Recording Academy Washington, D.C. Chapter Board as the Chapter's first-appointed adviser representing the VA Beach/Tidewater area.
 Ryan Farish won a GMA Dove Award at the 39th Annual GMAs (2007) and co-writer/co-publisher for a Grammy Award-nominated recording and has had several top ten Billboard.com charting albums. The GMA Dove Award was for co-writing the hit gospel song "Listen" for Trin-i-Tee 5:7.

Credits

Ryan Farish's 15th album Wonder is released on March 22, 2019, which debuts #14 on Billboard's Dance Electronic Album Sales chart.

In 2018, Farish's album Wilderness debuted #1 on the iTunes and Amazon Top Electronic Album Charts as well as debut on the Billboard Charts at #2. For the very first time, Ryan features his own vocals on several tracks like the self-titled track "Wilderness".

On November 3, 2017, Ryan Farish releases Primary Colors on Black Hole Recordings which charted #17 on Billboard's Dance/Electronic Album Sales.

In 2017, Ryan Farish's album United peaked on the Billboard charts at #9.

In 2015, Farish's 11th studio release, Spectrum was awarded the "Hot Shot Debut" by Billboard Magazine, coming in at chart position #5 for Best New Age Albums.

On November 19, 2013, Farish's single "Then Came the Sun" charted at #9 in the Sirius XM Electric Area Trance Top 20.

In 2005, Farish's album From the Sky peaked on the Billboard Charts at #3.

In 2004, Ryan Farish's album Beautiful peaked on the Billboard Charts at #10.

Discography

Studio albums
 2004 – Beautiful
 2005 – From the Sky 
 2006 – Everlasting 
 2008 – Wonderfall 
 2009 – Beautiful (Deluxe Version) 
 2009 – From the Sky (Deluxe Version) 
 2009 – Everlasting (Deluxe Version)
 2009 – Spirit (A Ryan Farish Christmas) – EP
 2009 – Movement in Light  
 2010 – Bloom 
 2010 – Opus 
 2011 – Opus Reloaded 
 2011 – Upon a Dream 
 2011 – Transcontinental EP with Paul Hardcastle and Ryan Farish
 2012 – Main Room Architecture 
 2012 – Life in Stereo 
 2013 – Destiny 
 2015 – Spectrum 
 2017 – United 
 2017 – Primary Colors
 2018 – Wilderness
 2019 – Wonder
 2019 – Art for Life
 2020 - Land of the Sky
 2021 - Halcyon
 2021 - Rhythm of the Seasons
 2022 - Solstice
 2023 - Embers and Light

Singles
2008 – "Believe"
2008 – "Pacific Wind – Sunday Morning Mix" 
2008 – "In This Moment" 
2009 – "Clouds of Heaven" 
2009 – "Love Song"
2009 – "L.A. Nights" 
2009 – "Storm Chaser"
2010 – "Iceland" 
2010 – "Come Into My World" 
2010 – "Perfect Clarity" 
2010 – "Reflections" 
2010 – "Depth of Love" 
2010 – "Sunset Sky" 
2012 – "Light"
2013 – "Then Came the Sun"
2014 – "Love in the Air"  
2014 – "Home" 
2014 – "Distance (feat. Coury Palermo)" 
2008 – "Believe"
2008 – "Pacific Wind – Sunday Morning Mix" 
2008 – "In This Moment" 
2009 – "Clouds of Heaven" 
2009 – "Love Song"
2009 – "L.A. Nights" 
2009 – "Storm Chaser"
2010 – "Iceland" 
2010 – "Come Into My World" 
2010 – "Perfect Clarity" 
2010 – "Reflections" 
2010 – "Depth of Love" 
2010 – "Sunset Sky" 
2012 – "Light"
2013 – "Then Came the Sun"
2014 – "Love in the Air"  
2014 – "Home" 
2015 – "Distance (feat. Coury Palermo)" 
2016 – "Skyline"
2016 – "Stories in Motion"
2016 – "Stories in Motion (Sied van Riel Away to the Past Remix)"
2016 – "Stories in Motion (Sunny Lax Remix)" 
2017 – "Stars Collide" 
2017 – "Stars Collide (Extended Mix)"
2018 – "Find You (Daniel Kandi Remix)"
2022 - "Warmth of the Sun"
2022 - "Sea the Sky"
2022 - "Breathe in This Moment"
2022 - "Reverie"
2023 - "Skylight"

Remixes
2017 – Amnesia [Ryan Farish Remix] by Paul Oakenfold & Jordan Suckley on Perfecto Records Dreamstate, Vol. One (Bonus Track Version)

Live albums
2009 – Live at the National

Compilations
2002 – Selected Works
2003 – Selected Works Xpanded 
2008 – Spa Relaxation 
2009 – Rare & Remastered (2000–2002 Sessions)
2010 – Legacy (Greatest Hits 2000–2010) 
2017 – Legacy: Greatest Hits, Vol.2

Independent albums
2000 – In the Day
2002 – Daydreamer

See also 
List of ambient music artists

References

External links
DI.FM Chillout Dreams channel
Positive Chillout with Ryan Farish
The Recording Company Washington D.C. Chapter
Ryan Farish Yamaha Artist Page
Ryan Farish Discography
Official Site of Ryan Farish
Official Ryan Farish YouTube Channel
Ryan Farish's Myspace Page
 

Year of birth missing (living people)
Farish Ryan
American male composers
21st-century American composers
Electronic music radio shows
American DJs
American dance musicians
Chill-out musicians
American electronic musicians
American trance musicians
Radio personalities from Virginia
Electronic dance music DJs
21st-century American male musicians